The Chornomorets Odesa 2013–14 season is 23rd season of Odessa football club "Chornomorets" in the championships / cups of Ukraine, and 76th season in the history of the club. "Sailors" reached the last 32 of the UEFA Europa League, where they were eliminated by Lyon, where runners-up to Shakhtar Donetsk in the Ukrainian Super Cup and currently lie 4th in the Premier League and are at the semifinal stage of the Ukrainian Cup.

Following the compulsory winter break the championship was due to resume on 1 March 2014, but due to the civil unrest in the country after the riots in Kyiv and continuing on with the Crimean crisis, the Premier League delayed the start of the spring stage. A decision was made by the Ukrainian Premier League to resume the competition on 15 March.

Squad

Out on loan

Transfers

Summer

In:

Out:

Winter

In:

 

Out:

Competitions

Super Cup

Ukrainian Premier League

Results

League table

Ukrainian Cup

UEFA Europa League

Qualifying rounds

Group stages

Knoutout Stages

Squad statistics

Appearances and goals

|-
|colspan="14"|Players away from the club on loan:

|-
|colspan="14"|Players who appeared for Chornomorets Odesa who left the club during the season:

|}

Goal scorers

Disciplinary record

Notes

References

External links
 [www.chernomorets.odessa.ua/ Official website]

Chornomorets Odesa
FC Chornomorets Odesa seasons
Chornomorets Odesa